The 1924 United States presidential election in Ohio was held on November 4, 1924 as part of the 1924 United States presidential election. State voters chose twenty-four electors to the Electoral College, who voted for president and vice president.

Ohio was won decisively by the Republican Party candidate, incumbent President Calvin Coolidge with 58.33 percent of the popular vote. The Democratic Party candidate, John W. Davis, garnered only 23.70 percent of the popular vote.

The 1920s were a fiercely Republican decade in American politics, and Ohio in that era was a fiercely Republican state in presidential elections. The economic boom and social good feelings of the Roaring Twenties under popular Republican leadership virtually guaranteed Calvin Coolidge an easy win in the state against the conservative Southern Democrat John Davis, who had little appeal in Northern states like Ohio where his reticence on the Ku Klux Klan was opposed by large Catholic populations. Ohio had possessed a very powerful Ku Klux Klan organisation which had swept the state's elected offices in the previous year, but had a sufficiently large Catholic population that its delegates demanded an anti-KKK plank. Davis was also handicapped by a complete lack of support from local Democrats in the interests of state offices, despite efforts to campaign in the state in October.

Coolidge won a strong majority statewide even with the Republican vote being split by the strong third party candidacy of Robert M. La Follette, a Republican Senator who ran as the Progressive Party candidate and peeled away the votes of many progressive Republicans. Owing to Ohio being the most German of the states immediately north of the boundary with antebellum slave states, the Buckeye state was La Follette's best east of the Mississippi and Illinois Rivers, although his vote share was only one percent above his national figure. Nonetheless, La Follette easily outpolled Davis in the major urban areas of northern Ohio, and indeed carried many urban precincts in populous Cuyahoga County (Cleveland and suburbs). Indeed, as historian William Leuchtenburg has noted, La Follette "carried the city of Cleveland, a stronghold of the railway unions."   "A number of labor leaders, especially those prominent in the four great Railway Brotherhoods, espoused the La Follette cause..."

Results

Results by county

See also
 United States presidential elections in Ohio

Notes

References

Ohio
1924
1924 Ohio elections